The  are Japanese professional wrestling, or puroresu, awards that have been handed out by the Tokyo Sports magazine annually since 1974. The most publicized awards in Japanese professional wrestling, they are recognized by all the major promotions in the country, including All Japan Pro Wrestling, New Japan Pro-Wrestling, and Pro Wrestling Noah.

The awards are voted for by a committee made up of people involved with Japanese professional wrestling, including reporters and photographers. After the winners are announced in the middle of December, an award ceremony is held in Tokyo in January. Voting takes place in rounds. In landslide cases, the winner can be determined in a single round of voting, however, if no wrestler gets enough votes, the award can be left blank and not given out that year. Most notably, the award for female wrestler of the year was not given out between 2004 and 2008 and again in 2014, when the committee felt that no wrestler had the necessary qualifications.

The awards have been described as "legit to a degree", but also to spread them among different major promotions. For example, the award for the best technical wrestler may not be given to someone considered the best technical wrestler in puroresu, but to a top wrestler from a promotion that has not gotten any of the other awards. There are currently ten active awards given out by Tokyo Sports, including one dedicated to sport wrestling.

Active awards

MVP Award
Rebranded in 2010.

Rebranded in 2010.















Inactive awards

A special award, this award is typically given to Japanese champions in United World Wrestling World Wrestling Championships, or in the Olympic Games.

















See also
List of professional wrestling awards

References
General

Specific

Awards established in 1974
Professional wrestling awards
Professional wrestling-related lists
Puroresu
Awards by newspapers